Pseudocholinesterase may refer to:
 Butyrylcholinesterase, an enzyme
 Aryl-acylamidase, an enzyme